Charles Kemeys may refer to:

Sir Charles Kemeys, 2nd Baronet (c. 1614–1658)
Sir Charles Kemeys, 3rd Baronet (1651–1702), MP, son of the above
Sir Charles Kemeys, 4th Baronet (1688–1735), MP for Glamorganshire (UK Parliament constituency), son of the above